German submarine U-848 was a Type IXD2 U-boat built for Nazi Germany's Kriegsmarine during World War II. Laid down in Bremen and commissioned on 20 February 1943, the boat was a long-range Type IX, with four bow and two stern torpedo tubes.

She was commanded throughout her brief service life by Korvettenkapitän Wilhelm Rollmann, who led her through her sea trials and onto her first war patrol on 18 September 1943.

Design
German Type IXD2 submarines were considerably larger than the original Type IXs. U-848 had a displacement of  when at the surface and  while submerged. She had two shafts and two  propellers.

U-848 was fitted with six  torpedo tubes (four fitted at the bow and two at the stern), 24 torpedoes, one  SK C/32 naval gun, 150 rounds, and a  SK C/30 with 2575 rounds as well as two  C/30 anti-aircraft guns with 8100 rounds. The boat had a complement of fifty-five.

Service history
U-848s first patrol was to join the Monsun Gruppe, based in the Indian Ocean. On 2 November 1943, she torpedoed and sank the unescorted  British steamship Baron Semple NW of Ascension Island. All hands were lost.

Fate
She was intercepted after 49 days on 5 November 1943, off the coast of Brazil, by the United States Navy aircraft from VB-107. She was depth charged by 3 PB4Y-1 Liberators. All 63 hands were lost.

Summary of raiding history

References

Bibliography

 Bridgland, Tony, Waves of Hate, Leo Cooper, Great Britain: 2002. .

External links

World War II submarines of Germany
German Type IX submarines
World War II shipwrecks in the Atlantic Ocean
World War II shipwrecks in the South Atlantic
U-boats sunk by US aircraft
U-boats commissioned in 1943
U-boats sunk in 1943
1942 ships
Ships built in Bremen (state)
Ships lost with all hands
Maritime incidents in November 1943